Anto Raukas (17 February 1935 – 19 April 2021) was an Estonian geologist and science organiser.

Raukas was born in Tartu. In 1958 he graduated from Tartu University.

Since 1958, he worked at the Institute of Geology of Estonian Academy of Sciences. Since 1993, he was professor at Estonian Maritime Academy and, from 1995, he was head of the chair of environment techniques.

In 1991, 1996, 2003, and 2015, he received the Republic of Estonia science prize.

Memberships
 Estonian Academy of Sciences (since 1977)
 Royal Geographic Society (London) (since 1999)
 International Union for Quaternary Research (INQUA) (since 1999; honorary member)

References

1935 births
2021 deaths
Estonian geologists
University of Tartu alumni
Fellows of the Royal Geographical Society
People from Tartu
Members of the Estonian Academy of Sciences
20th-century Estonian scientists
20th-century geologists
21st-century Estonian scientists
21st-century geologists